Fork Union Military Academy (abbreviated as FUMA) is a private, all-male, college preparatory military boarding school located in Fork Union, Virginia. Founded in 1898, Fork Union is considered one of the premier military boarding academies in the United States.

Fork Union is a member of the Association of Military Colleges and Schools of the United States and the National Association of Independent Schools, and is affiliated with the Baptist General Association of Virginia. FUMA's curriculum extends from the 7th to 12th grade and also hosts a one-year postgraduate program.

History
 
Located on a  campus in the rolling hills of central Virginia's Piedmont region, Fork Union Military Academy was initially founded as Fork Union Academy in October 1898 by Dr. William E. Hatcher, a prominent local Baptist minister. The first class had nineteen students.

In 1902, the academy took on a military structure to provide organization, discipline, and physical development for the boys of what was a rapidly growing school. In 1913, the academy became an all-male institution and changed its name to Fork Union Military Academy. That same year, the academy began receiving support from the Baptist General Association of Virginia, which continues to this day.

Military organization is used to structure the daily routine. While the academy currently has no direct relationship with any branch of the military, the school's military system has been in place for more than 100 years.

Some of its buildings are named after benefactors that have helped fund their construction, for example, the Guy E. Beatty Library, the Estes Dining Center, and Jacobson Hall. Other buildings on campus are named in honor or memory of persons who are significant in the school's history, such as such as Hatcher Hall and the Wicker Science Center, both named in memory of past school presidents.

FUMA's crest shows a pair of crossed swords, a book and a star, each representing an aspect of the school motto: body, mind, and spirit.

Presidents of Fork Union Military Academy 
Dr. William E. Hatcher 1898-1912

Dr. Eldridge B. Hatcher 1912-1914

COL Clayton E. Crosland 1914-1917

COL Nathaniel J. Perkins 1917-1930

Dr. John J. Wicker 1930-1945

COL James C. Wicker 1945-1968

Col Kenneth T. Whitescarver, USMC (Ret.) 1968-1990

COL Charles T. Clanton, USA (Ret.) 1991-1993

Lt Gen John E. Jackson, Jr., USAF (Ret.) 1994-2011

RADM J. Scott Burhoe, USCG (Ret.) 2011-2018

Col David L. Coggins, USMC (Ret.) 2018-present

Academics

The school offers a variety of sports, clubs and organizations for cadet participation during free time in the week and on weekends. Athletics and clubs are a popular diversion from the rigors of cadet life at Fork Union.

Both Standard and Advanced High School Diplomas are offered. Graduating classes have routinely been awarded millions of dollars in scholarships.

One Subject Plan
Fork Union follows a unique curriculum schedule in the upper school (grades 9–12 and postgraduate) known as the One Subject Plan. Cadets at Fork Union take one subject at a time, as opposed to a conventional schedule with six to eight classes per day or a block schedule. They remain with the teacher of that course all day, every day during that period.

Military structure
Fork Union Military Academy provides a structured military environment for its cadets. Military aspects of Fork Union's system include the wearing of uniforms, a military-style organization of personnel, accountability for personal appearance and the state of one's room, ranks, and a chain of command. The rank structure adopted by the Corps of cadets mirrors the US Army's enlisted ranks, with the exclusion of the ranks of PV2 and Specialist. Its officer ranks mirror those of the Army JROTC's rank structure, with the rank of Cadet Colonel rarely being used.

The Upper School consists of cadets from 9th grade through Postgraduate year. The Upper School cadets reside in Jacobson Hall which is home to Alpha, Bravo, Charlie, Delta, and Echo Companies. There is also a drill team company, Retan Rifle (which exists for special events only), that performs in parades across Virginia. Members of the Upper School marching band march in parades on campus and around the state along with Retan Rifles and Fork Union's Bagpipe Corps. Cadet Officers and Non-Commissioned Officers (NCOs) live as a part of each company. Each company is subdivided into three platoons, each with its own NCOs and Officers. Platoons are subdivided into Squads led by Cadet Sergeants. Squad and Platoon leaders are accountable to the higher company leadership and to adult members of the Commandant's Department, as well as to their Tactical Officers (TACs), who are assigned to each company to supervise the cadets.

Campus

FUMA's campus is located on a  campus in the hills of the Virginia's Piedmont region.

Hatcher Hall – Administrative offices and liberal arts classrooms
Wicker Science Building and Moretz Learning Center – Math and Science classrooms and Fork Union's planetarium
Vaughan Hall – Social Center / Student Activities
Wicker Chapel
Veterans Memorial	
Guy E. Beatty Library
Dorothy Estes Dining Hall
Thomas Gymnasium 
Estes Athletic Complex - an  athletic center
Fork Union Aquatic Center 
Jacobson Hall – The , 250 room barracks opened for cadets August 20, 2012 and now houses Alpha, Bravo, Charlie, Echo, and Delta companies, replacing both Snead and Memorial Halls at a cost of approximately $20 million. Ground was broken October 22, 2010.

Athletics

FUMA's athletic program is most famous for its football team, which has produced 117 NFL players, and for its track & field team, ranked as one of the best in Virginia.

There are only two postgraduate athletic programs at Fork Union. The PG football team is led by head coach Frank Arritt. The PG basketball program was coached by Fletcher Arritt, the subject of a documentary titled "The Passing Game."

The Prep teams fielding players from grades 9–12 include Football, Basketball, Baseball, Lacrosse, Wrestling, Soccer, Cross Country, Track and Field, Orienteering, Shooting Sports, and Swimming and Diving.

The Fork Union Outdoor Track team won its 20th straight VISAA state championship in 2008.

Many athletes have gone on from the academy to compete in collegiate athletic programs, and pursue careers on professional teams. FUMA alumni have included numerous famous athletes, who have played in the NFL, MLB, and in numerous other leagues and sports.

Their rival Hargrave Military Academy discontinued their PG football team in 2013, however the rivalry continues in PG basketball as the two teams continue to compete every season

Student organizations
There are many different clubs and organizations that cadets can participate in while attending Fork Union. Though new clubs are often started annually by new cadets to meet demand, the more permanent list of clubs includes: National Honor Society, Honor Council, International Club, IDEA Club, Scuba, Math club, Speech and Debate, Robotics, Drama Club, Catholic Cadet Association, Chess Club, Band, Pep Band, Bagpipe Corps, Choir, and Woodworking.

Notable alumni

Politics
 Ike Franklin Andrews – Former U.S. Congressman from North Carolina
 Tim Holden – Former U.S. Congressman from Pennsylvania
 Harold Roe Bartle – Former Kansas City mayor, namesake of the Kansas City Chiefs and Alpha Phi Omega co-founder
 Robert Bloxom – Former Secretary of Agriculture and Forestry for the Commonwealth of Virginia
 Stanley C. Walker – Former president pro tempore of the Senate of Virginia
 Bo Gritz – Former Army Special Forces officer, Vietnam War POW/MIA activist and third-party presidential candidate in 1992

Military
 Earle Davis Gregory – First Virginian to receive the Medal of Honor and called the "Sergeant York" of Virginia
 Samuel G. Fuqua - Retired U.S. Navy Rear Admiral, taught at Fork Union. He was the highest-ranking officer to survive the USS Arizona on December 7, 1941. For his actions, he was awarded the Medal of Honor
 John T. Chain, Jr. – Retired U.S. Air Force General, former Commander in Chief of Strategic Air Command
George D. Miller — Retired U.S. Air Force Lieutenant General, former Vice Commander in Chief of Strategic Air Command. Following retirement he was the secretary-general of the United States Olympic Committee
 Robert H. Scales – Retired U.S. Army Major General, former Commandant of the U.S. Army War College

Businessmen
 Jeff Jones – CEO and President of H&R Block, formerly held executive posts with Target Corporation, Uber, and Gap Inc.
 Thomas Henry Davis – Founder and former Chairman of Piedmont Aviation, now known as US Airways
 Dan Panoz – Founder of Panoz Auto Development Company and Panoz Motor Sports
 Kevin Plank – CEO and Founder of Under Armour
 Jerry Richardson – Founder of the Carolina Panthers
 Ryan Wood, co-founder of the Under Armour company
 Nicholas A. Falbo - Served 57 years as an Executive Account & Financial Analyst for Ladenburg Thalmann, the oldest chair on the NY Stock Exchange

Education
 Edward H. Jennings – President of Ohio State University from 1981 to 1990
 Aubrey H. Camden (Class of 1907)– President of Hargrave Military Academy from 1918 to 1951
 Joseph Hathaway Cosby (Class of 1921)– President of Hargrave Military Academy from 1951 to 1970

Literature, television and arts
 Paul Epley, combat  journalist
Billy Campbell, actor 
 Lloyd Dobyns, former NBC reporter and correspondent
 David Huddleston, actor

Track and Field

 Ibrahim Mohamed Aden, runner

Swimming

Ali Khalafalla, 2016 Olympics Egypt

Basketball
 Kevin Laue – First Division I basketball player with one hand; played on a scholarship for Manhattan College
 Dan Ruland – Former professional basketball player
 Donald Sims – Professional basketball player
 Khyri Thomas (born 1996) - Drafted 38th overall in the 2018 NBA draft, currently with Maccabi Tel Aviv of the Israeli Basketball Premier League and the EuroLeague.
 Melvin Turpin (1960-2010) – 1st round pick (6th overall) 1984 NBA draft. Center.
 Kenny Williams (born 1969) - basketball player
 Shammond Williams – Drafted 34th overall in the 1998 NBA Draft and played nearly a decade in the NBA. On several Top 10 stats lists as a college player at UNC.
 Mike Young – Head men's basketball coach at Virginia Tech

National Football League

At least 117 players from Fork Union Military Academy have been drafted or signed by NFL teams.
At least 12 players from Fork Union Military Academy have been selected in the First Round of the NFL Draft since 1954, 7 players have been selected to one or more Pro Bowl appearances, and at least 12 players have been on teams that competed in Super Bowl games.

The list includes:
 Gaines Adams - 1st Round pick in the 2007 NFL Draft. Defensive lineman.
 Jerell Adams - 6th round pick in the 2015 NFL Draft.
 Danny Aiken - Signed as an undrafted free agent in 2011. Long Snapper. Super Bowl XLIX Champion.
 Antonio Allen - 7th round pick in the 2012 NFL Draft. Free Safety.
 Maurice Anderson - Signed as an undrafted free agent in 2000. Defensive Tackle. Super Bowl XXXVI Champion.
 Akeem Auguste - Signed as an undrafted free agent in 2013. Cornerback.
 Michael Badgley - Undrafted free agent. Signed with Indianapolis in 2018. Punter/kicker.
 Michael Barber - Undrafted free agent. Signed with Seattle Seahawks in 1995. Played five years.
 Isaiah Battle - 5th round pick in the 2015 Supplement NFL Draft.
 Darryl Blackstock - 3rd round pick in the 2005 NFL Draft. Linebacker.
 Russell Bodine - 4th round pick in the 2014 NFL Draft. Offensive lineman.
 Ken Brown - 4th round pick in the 1995 NFL Draft. Linebacker.
 Tom Brown - Signed by the Pittsburgh Steelers in 1942.
 Dorien Bryant - Undrafted free agent by the Pittsburgh Steelers. Wide Receiver.
 Plaxico Burress - 1st round pick in the 2000 NFL Draft. Super Bowl XLII Champion. Wide Receiver.
 Glenn Capriola  - 9th round pick in the 1977 NFL Draft.Running Back Detroit Lions.
 Anthony Castonzo - 1st round pick in the 2011 NFL Draft. Offensive Tackle.
 Erik Christensen - 7th round pick in the 1955 NFL Draft. Defensive End.
 Dexter Coakley - College Football Hall of Fame Inductee in 2011. 3rd round pick in the 1997 NFL Draft. Three-time Pro Bowl. Linebacker.
 Al Crow - 28th round pick in the 1955 NFL Draft. Defensive Tackle.
 Jim Davis - Undrafted free agent. Defensive End. Signed to the Jacksonville Jaguars in 2005.
 Josh Davis - Undrafted free agent. Signed by Miami Dolphins in 2005. Wide Receiver.
 Tyrone Davis - 4th round pick in the 1995 NFL Draft. Tight End. Super Bowl XXXII.
 Antonio Dingle - 7th round pick in the 1999 NFL Draft. Defensive Tackle.
 Ernest Dixon - Undrafted free agent. Signed with New Orleans in 1994. Played six seasons in the NFL. Linebacker.
 John Dorsey - 4th round pick in the 1984 NFL Draft. Played five seasons in the NFL. Linebacker.
 Marcus Dowtin - Signed as an undrafted free agent in 2012. Linebacker.
 Tyronne Drakeford - 2nd round pick in the 1994 NFL Draft. Super Bowl XXIX Champion. Cornerback.
 Darren Drozdov - Undrafted free agent. Signed with Denver in 1993. Defensive Tackle.
 Jim Druckenmiller - 1st round pick in the 1997 NFL Draft. Quarterback.
 Rickey Dudley - 1st round pick in the 1996 NFL Draft. Played nine years in the NFL. Tight End. Super Bowl XXXVII Champion.
 Jacoby Ford - 4th round pick in the 2010 NFL Draft. Wide Receiver.
 Will Furrer - College Hall of Fame Scholar Athlete. 4th round pick in the 1992 NFL Draft. Quarterback.
 Eddie George - Winner of the 1995 Heisman Trophy. College Football Hall of Fame Inductee in 2011. Super Bowl XXXIV. 4x All-Pro running back. 1st round pick of the 1996 NFL Draft. Played nine years in the NFL.
 DeMingo Graham - Undrafted free agent. Signed by the San Diego Chargers in 1999. Offensive Lineman. Played six years.
 Christian Hackenberg - 2nd round pick in the 2016 NFL Draft. Quarterback.
 Marques Hagans - Music City Bowl Champion. 5th round pick in the 2006 NFL Draft. Wide Receiver.
 Jay Hagood - Undrafted free agent. Signed by the New York Jets. Offensive Tackle.
 Steve Hamilton - 2nd round pick in the 1985 NFL Draft. Defensive End.
 Marquis Haynes - 4th round pick in the 2018 NFL Draft. Carolina Panthers. Defensive End.
 John Hilton - 6th round pick in the 1964 NFL Draft. Tight End. Played nine years in NFL.
 Mack Hollins - 4th round pick in the 2017 NFL Draft. Philadelphia Eagles. Wide Receiver.
 Montori Hughes - 5th round pick in the 2013 NFL Draft. Defensive End.
 Carlos Hyde - 2nd round pick in the 2014 NFL Draft. Running Back
 James Jackson - 3rd round pick in the 2001 NFL Draft. Running Back.
 Kareem Jackson - 1st round pick in the 2010 NFL Draft. Cornerback.
 Cardale Jones - 4th round pick in the 2016 NFL Draft. Quarterback.
 Robert Jones - 1st round pick in the 1992 NFL Draft. 1992 NFC Rookie of the Year. 3x Super Bowl Champion. Linebacker.
 Dave Kadela - Undrafted free agent. Signed by the Atlanta Falcons in 2001. Played five seasons in the NFL.
 Zach Kerr - Cincinnati Bengals 2021-present. Member of the 2021 Bengals Super Bowl LVI team. Signed by Indianapolis Colts in 2014. Nose tackle. 
 Jeff Komlo - 9th round pick in the 1979 NFL Draft to the Detroit Lions. Quarterback.
 Brian Kozlowski - Undrafted free agent. Signed by the New York Giants in 1993. Played in the Super Bowl XXXIII. Tight End.
 Brandon London - Undrafted free agent. Signed by the New York Giants in 2007. Wide Receiver. Super Bowl XLII Champion.
 Don Majkowski - 10th round pick by the Green Bay Packers in the 1987 NFL Draft. Played in 1989 Pro Bowl. Quarterback.
 Jimmy Martin - 7th round pick by the San Diego Chargers in the 2006 NFL Draft. Offensive Lineman.
 LeRon McCoy - 7th round pick by the Arizona Cardinals in the 2005 NFL Draft. Wide Receiver.
 Billy McMullen - 3rd round pick in the 2003 NFL Draft. Wide Receiver.
 Steve Meilinger - College Football Hall of Fame Inductee in 2013.  1st round pick in the 1954 NFL Draft. Defensive End.
 Phillip Merling - 2nd round pick in the 2008 NFL Draft. Played six seasons. Defensive End.
 Tom Miller - Played four season in the NFL (1943–46). A member of the Steagles in '43. Defensive End.
 Jacob Ruby - 1st round pick in the CFL in 2015. Offensive Tackle.
 Josh Morgan - 6th round pick in the 2008 NFL Draft. Wide Receiver.
 Morgan Moses - 3rd round pick in the 2014 NFL Draft. Offensive Tackle.
 Eric Moss - Undrafted free agent. Signed by the Minnesota Vikings in 1997. Offensive Lineman.
 Don Oakes - 3rd round pick by the Philadelphia Eagles in the 1961 NFL Draft. Offensive Tackle. 1967 Pro Bowl.
 Roman Oben - 3rd round pick in the 1996 NFL Draft. Super Bowl XXXVII Champion. Offensive Tackle.
 Mark Parson - Signed as an undrafted free agent in 2009. Cornerback.
 Austin Pasztor - 1st round pick in the CFL in 2012. Later signed as an undrafted free agent in the NFL. Offensive Tackle.
 Olsen Pierre - Undrafted free agent. Signed with the Chicago Bears in 2015. Played four seasons with the Arizona Cardinals. Defensive lineman for the New York Giants.
 Chris Perry - Finalist (4th in voting) for 2003 Heisman Trophy. 1st round pick in the 2004 NFL Draft. Played five seasons. Running back.
 Bobby Phillips - Undrafted free agent. Signed by the Minnesota Vikings in 1995. Running Back.
 Kelcy Quarles - Signed as an undrafted free agent in 2014. Defensive Tackle.
 Mike Quick - 1st round pick in the 1982 NFL Draft. 5x Pro Bowl. Wide Receiver.
 Sonny Randle - 4x Pro Bowl. 19th round pick in the 1958 NFL Draft. Wide Receiver.
 Derek Rivers - 3rd round pick in the 2017 NFL Draft. New England Patriots. Defensive End.
 Tyrone Robertson - 7th round pick in the 2001 NFL Draft. Defensive Tackle.
 Mohammed Seisay - Signed as an undrafted free agent in 2014. Cornerback.
 Ashley Sheppard - 4th round pick in the 1993 NFL Draft. Played three seasons. Linebacker.
 C.J. Spillman - Signed as an undrafted free agent in 2009. Strong Safety. Played seven seasons.
 Marquis Spruill - Signed as an undrafted free agent in 2014. Inside Linebacker.
 Shannon Taylor - Played four seasons in the NFL from 2000–03.
 Vinny Testaverde - College Football Hall of Fame Inductee in 2013.  Winner of the 1986 Heisman Trophy. First overall pick in the 1st round of the 1987 NFL Draft. 2x Pro Bowl. 21 seasons in the NFL.
 Art Thomas - Undrafted free agent. Signed by the New York Jets in 2004. Corner back. Played four seasons.
 Michael Thomas - 2nd round pick in the 2016 NFL Draft. Wide Receiver.
 Stacy Tutt - Undrafted free agent. Signed with New York Jets in 2006. Full Back.
 Terrance West - 3rd round pick in the 2014 NFL Draft. Running Back.
 Ernest Wilford - 4th round pick in the 2004 NFL Draft. Wide Receiver.
 Joe Williams - 4th round pick in the 2017 NFL Draft. Running Back. San Francisco 49ers.
 Lee Williamson - Undrafted free agent. Signed by the Houston Oilers in 1993. Quarterback. Played four seasons.
 Jamaine Winborne - Played four seasons in the NFL. Cornerback.
 Ryan Wood - 7th round pick in the 1996 NFL Draft. Co-Founder of Under Armour with FUMA teammate Kevin Plank.

References

External links

 Official website
 FUMA YouTube profile

Baptist Christianity in Virginia
Baptist schools in the United States
Christian schools in Virginia
Educational institutions established in 1898
Military high schools in the United States
Private high schools in Virginia
Private middle schools in Virginia
Schools in Fluvanna County, Virginia
Boarding schools in Virginia
Boys' schools in the United States
1898 establishments in Virginia